Itajobi is a municipality in the state of São Paulo, Brazil. The city has a population of 15,297 inhabitants and an area of 502.1 km².

Itajobi belongs to the Mesoregion of São José do Rio Preto.

References

Municipalities in São Paulo (state)